Rama Varma Union High School is an upper primary with secondary school in Vypeen, Cherai, India. It was founded in 1907 as Union School. It offers education for students from fifth standard to tenth standard.

Activities
The school offers a nature club.

Alumni
 Sunil P. Ilayidom, writer and critic in the Malayalam language.
 Mary Verghese (1925–1986), physician

References

High schools and secondary schools in Kochi